Stephen Richard Goble (born 5 September 1960) is an English retired footballer who played in England, the Netherlands and Sweden as a left winger.

Career
Born in Erpingham, Goble played for Norwich City, Groningen, Veendam, Utrecht, Heracles, Cambridge United and Skellefteå AIK.

He later moved to the United States to work as a coach.

Personal life
Goble's brother, Nolan, was killed in the April 2009 North Sea helicopter crash, off the coast of Aberdeen.

References

1960 births
Living people
People from Erpingham
English footballers
Norwich City F.C. players
FC Groningen players
SC Veendam players
FC Utrecht players
Heracles Almelo players
Cambridge United F.C. players
Skellefteå FF players
English Football League players
Eredivisie players
Association football wingers
English expatriate footballers
English expatriate sportspeople in the Netherlands
Expatriate footballers in the Netherlands
English expatriate sportspeople in Sweden
Expatriate footballers in Sweden